Bugiri Sugar Company Limited, is a sugar manufacturer in Uganda.

Location

Overview
Bugiri Sugar Factory is a new manufacturer of sugar in Uganda. As of May 2021, the factory is under construction, on a  piece of real estate in Bugubo Village. With no sizable nucleus plantation of its own, the factory expects to source sugarcane primarily from out growers in the district and sub-region.

The new factory expects to begin commercial production in December 2021. When fully operational, the factory expects to produce 4,800 bags of  each, of crystalline sugar, at maximum capacity. In May 2021, the Daily Monitor reported that Bugiri Sugar Factory plans to focus on production of industrial sugar and industrial ethanol.

History
As of May 2021, Uganda had five major sugar manufacturers, namely (a) GM Sugar Uganda Limited (b) Kakira Sugar Works (c) Kinyara Sugar Works Limited (d) Sango Bay Estates Limited and Sugar Corporation of Uganda Limited. Starting in 2011, a plethora of smaller sugar manufacturers began to acquire manufacturing licenses, so that by 2021 these smaller manufacturers number about 20. The majority of them are located in Busoga.

As it turns out, many of the smaller outfits are owned by one or another of the big five manufacturers. Out grower farmers find it difficult to sell their cane profitably because of collusion between the large manufacturers and their subsidiary smaller outfits.

Bugiri Sugar Factory is expected to offer some relief to out grower farmers because (a) it has no nucleus farm of its own (b)
it has no subsidiary factory to collude with and (c) out grower farmers are the main source of raw sugarcane.

Ownership
As of May 2021, the shareholding in Bugiri Sugar Factory is private and not widely publicly known.

See also
 List of sugar manufacturers in Uganda
 List of power stations in Uganda

References

External links
  Uganda Sees 11% Growth In Sugar Output This Year As of 2019.
 Uganda Manufactures 510,000 Metric Tonnes of Sugar Annually, of Which 360,000 Metric Tonnes Are Consumed Locally As of July 2020.

Sugar companies of Uganda
Food and drink companies established in 2020
Busoga
Bugiri District
Eastern Region, Uganda
2020 establishments in Uganda